Kypriadou, formerly known as Alysida is a neighborhood of Athens, Greece.

It is named for agronomist Epameinondas Kypriadis (1888-1958).

Transport
Ano Patisia metro station on Line 1 of the Athens Metro serves the area.

References

Neighbourhoods in Athens